The 2nd Destroyer Squadron was an administrative unit of the Royal Navy from 1956 to 1971.

Operational history
In October 1956 the 2nd Destroyer Flotilla was on general assignment  when it was disbanded and succeeded by the 2nd Destroyer Squadron in November 1956. During its existence, the squadron included Daring-class destroyers and Leander-class frigates.

Deployments
Included:

Squadron commander

See also
 List of squadrons and flotillas of the Royal Navy

References

External links

Destroyer squadrons of the Royal Navy